Constellation Dome is an ice-covered prominence,  high, the highest feature in the Darley Hills, standing  west of Gentile Point, between the Ross Ice Shelf and Nursery Glacier. It was so named by the Northern Party of the New Zealand Geological Survey Antarctic Expedition (1960–61) because it was here that the party carried out the first astro fix of the journey.

References 

Ice caps of Antarctica
Shackleton Coast